The 1949 Ottawa Rough Riders finished in 1st place in the Interprovincial Rugby Football Union with an 11–1 record, but lost the IRFU Finals to the eventual Grey Cup champion Montreal Alouettes. This season was the best in franchise history, in terms of winning percentage, since the undefeated team from the 1905 season. This season also set the franchise record for most wins in a season, which would be matched, but not surpassed, four more times.

Preseason

Regular season

Standings

Schedule

Postseason

Playoffs

References

Ottawa Rough Riders seasons
1949 Canadian football season by team